Lagrâce-Dieu is a commune in the Haute-Garonne department in southwestern France.

Geography
The commune is bordered by six other communes: Miremont to the north, Auterive to the east, Puydaniel to the south, Esperce to the southwest, Saint-Sulpice-sur-Lèze to the west, and finally by Auribail to the northwest.

Population

See also
Communes of the Haute-Garonne department

References

Communes of Haute-Garonne